Issy Bloomberg (10 February 1930 – 1 December 2000) was a South African weightlifter. He competed at the 1948 Summer Olympics and the 1952 Summer Olympics.

References

1930 births
2000 deaths
South African male weightlifters
Olympic weightlifters of South Africa
Weightlifters at the 1948 Summer Olympics
Weightlifters at the 1952 Summer Olympics
Place of birth missing
Weightlifters at the 1950 British Empire Games
Commonwealth Games medallists in weightlifting
Commonwealth Games silver medallists for South Africa
20th-century South African people
Medallists at the 1950 British Empire Games